Kim Lee-Sub (born April 27, 1974 ) is a South Korean former football player who since 2004 has played for Incheon United (formerly Pohang Steelers and Jeonbuk Hyundai).

References

External links

1974 births
Living people
South Korean footballers
Incheon United FC players
Pohang Steelers players
Jeonbuk Hyundai Motors players
K League 1 players
Association football goalkeepers